Shin Dam-yeong ( or  ; born 2 October 1993) is a South Korean footballer who plays for Hyundai Steel Red Angels and the South Korean national team. She was originally slated to participate at the 2015 FIFA Women's World Cup, but upon being injured, Kim Hye-yeong on a reserve list replaced injured her on 4 June 2015.

International goals
Scores and results list South Korea's goal tally first.

References

External links

1993 births
Living people
South Korean women's footballers
South Korea women's under-17 international footballers
South Korea women's under-20 international footballers
South Korea women's international footballers
Women's association football defenders
WK League players
Suwon FC Women players
Incheon Hyundai Steel Red Angels WFC players
Footballers at the 2014 Asian Games
Footballers at the 2018 Asian Games
Asian Games bronze medalists for South Korea
Asian Games medalists in football
Medalists at the 2014 Asian Games
Medalists at the 2018 Asian Games
2019 FIFA Women's World Cup players